The British School of Tehran (BST) was a British international school in Tehran, Iran.

The British and Dutch embassies in Tehran jointly established the school in 2000. During its life, the Ministry of Foreign Affairs (Iran) only permitted non-Iranian students to attend; students came from 32 countries as of 2010. Admissions priority was given to British and Dutch children.

It closed indefinitely after the 2011 attack on the British Embassy in Iran. The school board of trustees voted to have the school disestablished, with the end date being 31 December 2011. The German Embassy School Tehran (DBST) acquired the assets of the BST and established an international section in the former BST buildings. At the end of the school's life it had 117 students.

References

External links

 British School of Tehran (Archive)

International schools in Tehran
2000 establishments in Iran
Educational institutions established in 2000
2011 disestablishments in Iran
Educational institutions disestablished in 2011
British international schools in Asia